St Peter's Church, Monkwearmouth is the parish church of Monkwearmouth in Sunderland, Tyne and Wear, England. It is one of three churches in the Parish of Monkwearmouth. The others are the Victorian All Saints' Church, Monkwearmouth and the Edwardian St Andrew's Church, Roker.

St Peter's was founded in AD 674–5 as one of the two churches of the Benedictine double monastery of Monkwearmouth–Jarrow Abbey. The other church is St Paul's Church, Jarrow. St Peter's is a Grade I listed building and part of a scheduled monument.

Architecture

Anglo-Saxon
The original church on the site was built at the behest of Benedict Biscop in AD 674–75, when the area was part of the Anglo-Saxon Kingdom of Northumbria. Bede (circa 673–735) wrote that Benedict brought stonemasons and glassworkers from Gaul to build the church, as these crafts were not yet established in Anglo-Saxon England.

Of Benedict's building only the west wall and porch survive. The ground floor of the porch is barrel vaulted. Its outer arch, at the west end of the porch, is of elaborate design and decorated with stone reliefs.

By about AD 700 the porch had been enlarged by the addition of a second storey and north and south porticus, forming a westwork. By the end of the 10th century further storeys had been added to the porch, raising its height to form the present west tower.

Gothic and Gothic Revival
The rest of the church is much later. The north aisle was first built in the 13th century. A five-light east window was inserted in the chancel in the 14th century.

Early in the 19th century the arcade of the north aisle and most of the chancel arch were removed, and galleries were inserted.

In 1875–76 St Peter's was restored under the direction of the architects Hubert Austin and RJ Johnson, who had the north aisle rebuilt and the east window of the chancel replaced. There is also an organ loft built onto the north side of the chancel.

The present stained glass in the windows was made in 1969 by LC Evetts. In 1973 an octagonal extension was added east of the organ loft as an interpretation centre. In 1984 the church was damaged by fire, and about 1985 the interior and roof were rebuilt.

References

Bibliography

External links

 Parish of Monkwearmouth
 St. Peter's Wearmouth–Jarrow

7th-century church buildings in England
Churches in the City of Sunderland
Grade I listed churches in Tyne and Wear
Church of England church buildings in Tyne and Wear
Sunderland